Sui Weijie (born 6 April 1983) is a Chinese football goalkeeper, who plays for Shijiazhuang Gongfu in the China League One.

Club career
Sui started his football career with Harbin Lange and transferred to China League Two club Sichuan Jinying in 2004. He moved to Hong Kong in 2005 and played for Happy Valley, Bulova Rangers and Fourway Rangers successively. Sui was involved in match-fixing scandal when he played for Fourway Rangers and investigated by Independent Commission Against Corruption (ICAC) in 2010. He left Hong Kong without charge and joined China League Two club Fushun Xinye in 2011.

Sui moved to China League One side Tianjin Songjiang in February 2012 after playing at Fushun Xinye and failing to gain promotion to China League One. He was the key player of the club and set a new club record for consecutive clean sheets with 708 minutes in the 2012 season. Sui lost his position in the club after Pei Encai became the manager of Tianjin Songjiang in 2013. He was linked with League Two club Jiangxi Liansheng in July 2013; however, he was loaned to another League Two club Hebei Zhongji several days later. Sui played 12 matches for Hebei Zhongji, helping the club gain runners-up of the season and win promotion to China League One.

On 2 January 2014, Sui transferred to China League One side Chongqing Lifan. He became the first choice goalkeeper on the third matchday after Chongqing lost the first two matches of the season, helping the club to win a 27-match unbeaten run and promoted to Chinese Super League. Especially, Sui set a new China League One record for consecutive clean sheets with 796 minutes on 2 August 2014, beating the previous record of 732 minutes set by Yu Ziqian of Dalian Aerbin in the 2011 season. On 8 March 2015, Sui made his Super League debut in the season's first match which Chongqing Lifan lost to Beijing Guoan 3–0. On 24 May 2015, in a Super League match against Liaoning Whowin, he left his goal unguarded to take a water break after Chongqing Lifan conceded a free kick. Liaoning's Ding Haifeng took the free kick quickly and scored the equalizer as Sui was still drinking water next to the goal post. He was fined ¥50,000 by the club but kept his position as a main player. He played 28 league matches for the club in the 2015 season, as Chongqing Lifan secured to stay in the top flight for the next season. He became the second choice goalkeeper of the club after Deng Xiaofei joined Chongqing in 2016 season.

Career statistics
Statistics accurate as of match played 31 December 2020.

Honours

Club
Harbin Lange
 China League Two: 2002

Happy Valley
 Hong Kong First Division League: 2005–06

Chongqing Lifan
 China League One: 2014

References

External links
 

1983 births
Living people
Association football goalkeepers
Chinese footballers
Footballers from Dalian
Happy Valley AA players
Hong Kong Rangers FC players
Fourway Athletics players
Tianjin Tianhai F.C. players
Hebei F.C. players
Chongqing Liangjiang Athletic F.C. players
Chinese Super League players
China League One players
China League Two players
Hong Kong First Division League players
Expatriate footballers in Hong Kong
Hong Kong League XI representative players